The Legend of Wisely ( or ; released in the Philippines as Fighters of the Empire) is a 1987 Hong Kong fantasy adventure film directed by Teddy Robin based on Ni Kuang's novel series, Wisely Series, starring Samuel Hui as the titular protagonist. The film co-stars Ti Lung, Joey Wong and Robin himself.

Plot
Wisely, the famous writer/adventurer, is tricked by his friend (played by Teddy Robin, the film's director) into helping him steal the dragon pearl. Samuel Hui plays Wisely in this big budget Hong Kong movie, with production units filming some scenes by the Great Pyramids, and many scenes in Nepal. There are car chases and crashes, chases by horsemen and plenty of fights along the way. The Legend of Wisely is a live action comic book. A lot of effort went into making this movie, and it shows as Wisely goes from one hazard to another, a Hong Kong version of Indiana Jones.

Cast
Samuel Hui as Wisely
Ti Lung as Pak Kei-wai
Teddy Robin as David Ko
Joey Wong as Sue Pak 
Alan Ko as Little Master
Bruce Baron as Howard Hope
Heidi Makinen as Hope's assistant
Blackie Ko as The Two Headed Snake
Lee Hoi-hing as Hing
Paulo Tocha
Wellington Fung as Fake David Ko
Kim Fan as Little Master's guardian
Ng Chiu-leung
Lee Tak-shing
Chen Chun-kun
Chang Sing-kwong
Eva Cobo

Also known as
Legend of Wisely
Legend of Wu
Wai Si-Lei chuen kei
La Légende de la perle d'or
Legenda o zlaté perle
Wei si li chuan ji (China: Mandarin title)
Wisely Legend (literal English title)

Release
The Legend of Wisely was released in Hong Kong on 21 January 1987. In the Philippines, the film was released by Pioneer Releasing as Fighters of the Empire on 9 March 1988.

See also
Wisely Series, the novel series by Ni Kuang
Films and television series adapted from the Wisely Series:
The Seventh Curse, a 1986 Hong Kong film starring Chow Yun-fat as Wisely
The Cat (1992 film), a 1998 Hong Kong film starring Waise Lee as Wisely
The New Adventures of Wisely, a 1998 Singaporean television series starring Michael Tao as Wisely
The Wesley's Mysterious File, a 2002 Hong Kong film starring Andy Lau as Wisely
The 'W' Files, a 2003 Hong Kong television series starring Gallen Lo as Wisely

References

External links

1987 films
1987 action films
1980s fantasy adventure films
1987 fantasy films
1987 martial arts films
1980s Cantonese-language films
Films about writers
Films based on Chinese novels
Films shot in Nepal
Hong Kong action comedy films
Hong Kong fantasy adventure films
Hong Kong martial arts films
1980s Hong Kong films